Both the men's and the women's field hockey competitions at the 2018 Central American and Caribbean Games was held in conjunction with one another between 20 – 30 July 2018 in Barranquilla, Colombia.

The top two teams in each tournament qualified for the 2019 Pan American Games in Lima, Peru.

Medal summary

Medalists

Medal table

Qualification

Men's qualification

Women's qualification

Men's tournament

Preliminary round
All times are local (UTC –5).

Pool A

Pool B

Fifth to eighth place classification

5–8th place semifinals

7th & 8th place

5th & 6th place

First to fourth place classification

Semifinals

Third and fourth place

Final

Final standings

Women's tournament

Preliminary round
All times are local (UTC –5).

Pool A

Pool B

Fifth to eighth place classification

5–8th place semifinals

7th & 8th place

5th & 6th place

First to fourth place classification

Semifinals

Third and fourth place

Final

Final standings

References

External links
2018 Central American and Caribbean Games – Field hockey 

2018 Central American and Caribbean Games events
Qualification tournaments for the 2019 Pan American Games
Central American and Caribbean Games
2018
2018 Central American and Caribbean Games